Merrick is a  hamlet and census-designated place (CDP) in the Town of Hempstead in Nassau County, on the South Shore of Long Island, in New York, United States. , the population was 20,130.

Geography

Merrick has a climate that is bordering upon hot-summer humid continental (Dfa) and humid subtropical (Cfa.) The Cfa zone is found along Merrick's coast. The average monthly temperatures in the town centre range from 31.7 °F in January to 74.8 °F in July.  The local hardiness zone is 7b.

Demographics

, there were 22,764 people, 7,524 households, and 6,478 families residing in the CDP. The population density was 5,423.3 per square mile (2,092.7/km2). There were 7,602 housing units at an average density of 1,811.1/sq mi (698.8/km2). The racial makeup of the CDP was 95.18% White, 0.56% African American, 0.10% Native American, 2.24% Asian, 0.01% Pacific Islander, 0.94% from other races, and 0.98% from two or more races.

There were 7,524 households, out of which 42.9% had children under the age of 18 living with them, 76.0% were married couples living together, 7.6% had a female householder with no husband present, and 13.9% were non-families. 11.6% of all households were made up of individuals, and 6.6% had someone living alone who was 65 years of age or older. The average household size was 3.02 and the average family size was 3.27.

In the CDP, the population was spread out, with 27.5% under the age of 18, 5.4% from 18 to 24, 27.7% from 25 to 44, 26.7% from 45 to 64, and 12.7% who were 65 years of age or older. The median age was 40 years. For every 100 females, there were 93.2 males. For every 100 females age 18 and over, there were 90.8 males.

The median income for a household in the CDP was $93,132, and the median income for a family was $99,589. (According to a 2007 estimate, these values had risen to $111,536 and $122,319 respectively.) Males had a median income of $79,607 versus $41,618 for females. The per capita income for the CDP was $26,334. About 2.0% of families and 2.8% of the population were below the poverty line, including 3.6% of those under age 18 and 2.2% of those age 65 or over.

Education

School districts 
Merrick is served by the Merrick and North Merrick Union Free School Districts for elementary education, and by the Bellmore–Merrick Central High School District for secondary education.

Transportation 
Merrick is served by the Merrick station on the Long Island Rail Road on the Babylon Branch.

Notable people

 Craig Allen, Fox News weatherman
 Roone Arledge, former president of ABC Sports/News
 Justin Beck, guitarist in the band Glassjaw
 Melissa Howard Beck, cast member, The Real World New Orleans
 Ed Begley, actor
 Ed Begley Jr., actor
 Janet Billig, record executive, Broadway producer
 Brian Bloom, actor
 Schuyler V. Cammann, professor of Oriental Studies, University of Pennsylvania
 Vinnie Caruana, lead singer of I Am the Avalanche and The Movielife
 Leonard Chang, author
 CheapyD, owner of Cheap Ass Gamer
 Ben Cohen, co-founder of Ben and Jerry's ice cream
 Doreen Cronin, children's author
 Doug Ellin, writer/creator of Entourage
 Paul Feinman (1960–2021), associate judge of the New York Court of Appeals
 Amy Fisher, the "Long Island Lolita"
 Frank Frazetta, fantasy artist 
 Bill Freiberger, Emmy-nominated writer/producer of The Simpsons, The PJs
 Debbie Gibson, singer
 Lindsay Gilman, screenwriter
 Michael Gilman, deckhand on Below Deck Adventure
 Jerry Greenfield, co-founder of Ben and Jerry's ice cream
 Ryan Hunter, lead vocalist of the band Envy On The Coast
 Danny Kopec, international chess master
 Michael Kors, fashion designer
 Paul R. Krugman, 2008 Nobel Prize in Economics, New York Times columnist, professor and scholar
 Scott Lipsky (born 1981), tennis player
 The Lohan family, including Lindsay, Michael Jr., Ali, Dakota and Dina Lohan
 Elliot S. Maggin, writer
 Romeo Muller, screenplay writer of Santa Claus Is Coming to Town, Frosty the Snowman, Little Drummer Boy
 Constantinos Philippou, mixed martial artist
 Mario Puzo, author of the novel The Godfather (later adapted to film by Francis Ford Coppola)
 Peter Ragone, public affairs expert and entrepreneur
 Steve Rifkind, hip hop entrepreneur
 Robbie Rosen, singer, contestant on season 10 of American Idol
 Noah Rubin (born 1996), tennis player
 Matt Cardona, WWE professional wrestler, former WWE Intercontinental Champion and WWE United States Champion, WWE Tag Team Champion
 Sha Na Na (George and Rob Leonard), Woodstock festival, Grease album rock group
 Kevin Shinick, Emmy-winning writer, best selling author, notably Robot Chicken and Star Wars Force Collector, in which he named a planet "Merokia" after his home town. Was the host of the PBS game show Where in Time is Carmen Sandiego?
 James Siegel, author of Derailed, adapted to a film starring Jennifer Aniston and Clive Owen
Lou Silver, American-Israeli basketball player
Marc Slutsky, musician
Bruce Sussman, songwriter
Lee Tepper, co-founder of MerchDirect with Glassjaw's Justin Beck

In popular culture

Films 
 2002 – Blue Vinyl (dir. Daniel B. Gold and Judith Helfand)
 2019 – Abigail (dir. Max Hechtman and Christonikos Tsalikis)

Television 

 1996 - 2005 – Everybody Loves Raymond – The homes used for the exterior shots for Frank and Marie's residence and Raymond and Debra Barone's residence in the show are located located within the hamlet, at 136 and 135 Margaret Boulevard, respectively.

See also
 Norman Levy Park and Preserve

References

External links

 Merrick Chamber of Commerce
 Merrick Fire Department
 Merrick Public Library

Hempstead, New York
Census-designated places in New York (state)
Hamlets in New York (state)
Census-designated places in Nassau County, New York
Hamlets in Nassau County, New York